Ademir Kenović (born September 14, 1950) is a Bosnian film director and producer.

He graduated from the University of Sarajevo in 1975. In 1972–73 he studied film, English literature and art at the Denison University in Ohio. His films include Kuduz (1989) and A Little Bit of Soul (1987). His 1997 work The Perfect Circle won the François Chalais Prize. He also produced the popular 2004 Bosnian film Days and Hours.

References

External links 

 
 Ademir Kenović at Bosnian Wikiquote

1950 births
Living people
Bosniaks of Bosnia and Herzegovina
Film people from Sarajevo
Denison University alumni
Bosnia and Herzegovina film directors
Bosnia and Herzegovina film producers